Marie-France (Marie-France Plumer; born 7 February 1943) is a French actress known mainly for her roles as a child.

Filmography
 Return to Life, 1949
 Beautiful Love (1951)
 Dortoir des grandes, 1954

External links

1943 births
Living people
French child actresses
French film actresses